Countess Palatine Anna Magdalena of Birkenfeld-Bischweiler (14 February 1640 – 12 December 1693) was a daughter of Christian I, Count Palatine of Birkenfeld-Bischweiler (1598–1654) and his first wife, Countess Palatine Magdalene Catherine of Zweibrücken (1606–1648).

Life 
Anna Magdalena was born in Strasbourg. She married, on 18 October 1659, Johann Reinhard II of Hanau-Lichtenberg (1628–1666), a posthumous member of the House of Hanau, who never came to the throne.  The marriage produced five children:
 Johanna Magdalene of Hanau-Lichtenberg (18 December 1660 in Bischofsheim am Hohen Steg - 21 August 1715).  She is said to have been buried in the St. Mary's Church in Hanau; married on 5 December 1685 to John, Count of Leiningen-Dagsburg-Falkenburg (17 March 1662 - 3 November 1698).
 Louise Sophie of Hanau-Lichtenberg (11 April 1662 in Bischofsheim am Hohen Steg - 9 April 1751 in Ottweiler); married on 27 September 1697 to Frederick Louis, Count of Nassau-Saarbrücken-Ottweiler (13 November 1651 - 25 May 1728)
 Franziska Albertina of Hanau-Lichtenberg (1 May 1663 in Bischofsheim am Hohen Steg - 1736 in Ottweiler); unmarried.
 Philip Reinhard, Count of Hanau-Münzenberg (2 August 1664 in Bischofsheim am Hohen Steg - 4 October 1712 at Philippsruhe Castle in Hanau)
 Johann Reinhard III of Hanau-Lichtenberg (31 July 1665 in Bischofsheim am Hohen Steg - 28 March 1736 in Philippsruhe Castle).

Anna Magdalena's widow seat was Babenhausen Castle in Babenhausen.

Death 
Anna Magdalena died on 12 December 1693 at Babenhausen and was buried on 6 February 1694 in the family vault of the St. John's Church in Hanau.  This tomb, including Anna Magdalena's grave, was in completely destroyed by bombing during the Second World War.

On the occasion of her funeral, several funeral sermons appeared in print:
 Anonymous, Klüglich gewählet, seelig entseelet ..., printed in Hanau in 1694 by Johann Adolph Aubry 
 Anonymous, Kürzlich entworfene Personalia ...
 Friedrich Christian of Edelsheim, Hanau in 1694?
 Johann Daniel Guckelin, [funeral sermon] 
 M. Langermann und Johannes Laurentius, Lob- und Ehrengedächtnis ..., printed in Hanau by Johann Adolph Aubry 
 Adam Sellius, [funeral sermon]

References 
 Katalog der fürstlich Stolberg-Stolberg’schen Leichenpredigten-Sammlung. Bd. 3, Leipzig 1930.
 Katalog der Leichenpredigten und sonstigen Trauerschriften im Hessischen Staatsarchiv Darmstadt = Marburger Personalschriften-Forschungen, vol. 13, Sigmaringen, 1991.
 Rudolf Lenz u.a.: Katalog der Leichenpredigten und sonstigen Trauerschriften in der Universitätsbibliothek Gießen = Marburger Personalschriften-Forschungen, vol. 7,1. Marburg,1985.
 Reinhard Suchier: Genealogie des Hanauer Grafenhauses, in: Festschrift des Hanauer Geschichtsvereins zu seiner fünfzigjährigen Jubelfeier am 27. August 1894, Hanau, 1894.
 Reinhard Suchier: Die Grabmonumente und Särge der in Hanau bestatteten Personen aus den Häusern Hanau und Hessen, in: Programm des Königlichen Gymnasiums zu Hanau, Hanau, 1879. p. 1 - 56.
Ernst J. Zimmermann: Hanau Stadt und Land., 3rd ed., Hanau, 1919, reprinted 1978.

Footnotes 

1640 births
1693 deaths
17th-century German people
17th-century German women
Countesses Palatine of the Holy Roman Empire
House of Hanau
House of Wittelsbach
Daughters of monarchs